Tamil Solidarity, formerly the Stop the Slaughter of Tamils (SST), is a leftist activist group fighting for the rights of Tamils in Sri Lanka. It was formed in 2009 in Chennai, India during the war in Sri Lanka when thousands of Tamils were killed. It has been campaigning for the Tamil cause including in the European parliament.

References

External links
Tamil Solidarity
Statement from Tamil Solidarity Campaign
 Stop the Slaughter of Tamils

Imprisonment and detention
Human rights organisations based in the United Kingdom
Organisations based in London